Marindol is a settlement on the terrace above the left bank of the Kolpa River in the Municipality of Črnomelj in the White Carniola area of southeastern Slovenia. The area is part of the traditional region of Lower Carniola and is now included in the Southeast Slovenia Statistical Region.

Name
Marindol was first attested in written sources in 1477 as Marintall (and in 1490 as Marental). The name is a compound formed from *Mari(ji)n dol (literally, 'Mary's valley'). The settlement was also once known as Šobatovci or Šobatovo selo, or Šabotovo/Šobotovo selo, cited as Shebatova sella in 1674.

References

External links
Marindol on Geopedia

Populated places in the Municipality of Črnomelj
Serb communities in Slovenia